Oisín Dowling (born 23 June 1997) is an Irish rugby union player, who currently plays for Connacht Rugby. He plays as a lock or flanker.

Underage rugby
Dowling attended St Michael's College, Dublin and played alongside fellow Leinster locks Ross Molony and James Ryan there. Dowling spent time in the Leinster sub-academy after leaving schools, before being promoted to the full academy. He was selected for the  Ireland U20 team in 2017, a year where they struggled, finishing fourth in the under-20 Six Nations and tenth in the World Championship.

Professional career
Dowling was part of the Celtic Cup-winning Leinster 'A' side in 2018, a year in which he was also part of Lansdowne's historic clean sweep of the All-Ireland League, All-Ireland Cup, Leinster Senior League and Leinster Senior Cup. Dowling made his senior Leinster debut in January 2019 in a victory against fellow Irish province Ulster.

References

External links
Leinster Academy Profile
Pro14 Profile

1997 births
Living people
Rugby union players from Dublin (city)
People educated at St Michael's College, Dublin
Irish rugby union players
Lansdowne Football Club players
Connacht Rugby players
Leinster Rugby players
Rugby union locks